The Hurt Locker is a 2009 Iraq War film written by Mark Boal and directed by Kathryn Bigelow. The film premiered on September 4, 2008 at the 65th Venice International Film Festival, where it competed with The Wrestler for the Golden Lion award. It was released in Italy by Warner Bros. Pictures on October 10, 2008. Following a showing at the 33rd Toronto International Film Festival, Summit Entertainment picked the film up for distribution in the United States. The Hurt Locker was released in the United States on June 26, 2009, with a limited release at four theaters in Los Angeles and New York City. The film grossed over $145,000 on its opening weekend, averaging around $36,000 per theater. The following weekend, beginning July 3, the film grossed over $131,000 at nine theaters. It held the highest per-screen average of any movie playing theatrically in the United States for the first two weeks of its release, gradually moving into the top 20 chart. Summit Entertainment then released The Hurt Locker to more screens. The film grossed $49.2 million worldwide, and was a success against its budget of $15 million.

The Hurt Locker has earned various awards and nominations, with the nominations in categories ranging from recognition of the screenplay to its direction and editing to the cast's acting performance. Kathryn Bigelow dominated the Best Director category at the critics' circles. The 67th Golden Globe Awards ceremony saw The Hurt Locker receive three nominations for Best Motion Picture Drama, Director and Screenplay, but it failed to win any. The film garnered nine nominations at the 82nd Academy Awards; the ceremony saw the film come away with six awards, including Best Motion Picture, Director and Original Screenplay. Bigelow became the first woman to win the Academy Award for Best Director and she also became only the fourth woman to be nominated in the category in the history of the awards.

The Hurt Locker received two nominations at the 16th Screen Actors Guild Awards, for Outstanding Performance by a Male Actor for Jeremy Renner and Outstanding Performance by a Cast in a Motion Picture. The film won the Best Theatrical Motion Picture and Outstanding Directorial Achievement at the 21st Producers Guild of America Awards and the 62nd Directors Guild of America Awards respectively. The 35th LA Film Critics Association Awards, 75th NY Film Critics Circle Awards and the 44th National Society of Film Critics Association Awards saw the film win awards for Best Picture and Director. Both the American Film Institute and the Associated Press included The Hurt Locker in their Top Ten Films of 2009 lists. The Associated Press also placed the film at number six on their Top Ten Films of the Decade list.

It became one of the seven films to win Best Picture from three out of four major U.S. film critics' groups (LA, NBR, NY, NSFC) along with Nashville, All the President's Men, Terms of Endearment, Goodfellas, Pulp Fiction, and Drive My Car; and also the first film to win Academy Award for Best Picture since Terms of Endearment.

In 2020, the film was selected for preservation in the National Film Registry by the Library of Congress as being "culturally, historically, or aesthetically significant".

Awards and nominations

Notes

References

External links
 

Lists of accolades by film